Vadym Rodina (born 24 March 1988 in Kiev, in the Ukrainian SSR of the Soviet Union) is a Ukrainian football defender who played for FC Zirka Kirovohrad in the Ukrainian First League.

External links
Profile at Official Site FFU (Ukr)

1988 births
Living people
Ukrainian footballers
Association football defenders
FC Dynamo Kyiv players
FC Obolon-Brovar Kyiv players
FC Zirka Kropyvnytskyi players
Footballers from Kyiv